In differential geometry and algebraic geometry, the Enneper surface is a self-intersecting surface that can be described parametrically by:
 
It was introduced by Alfred Enneper in 1864 in connection with minimal surface theory.

The Weierstrass–Enneper parameterization is very simple, and the real parametric form can easily be calculated from it. The surface is conjugate to itself.

Implicitization methods of algebraic geometry can be used to find out that the points in the Enneper surface given above satisfy the degree-9 polynomial equation

Dually, the tangent plane at the point with given parameters is  where
 
Its coefficients satisfy the implicit degree-6 polynomial equation

The Jacobian, Gaussian curvature and mean curvature are

Another property is that all bicubical minimal Bézier surfaces are, up to an affine transformation, pieces of the surface.

It can be generalized to higher order rotational symmetries by using the Weierstrass–Enneper parameterization  for integer  k>1.

References

External links
 
 https://web.archive.org/web/20130501084413/http://www.math.hmc.edu/~gu/curves_and_surfaces/surfaces/enneper.html
 https://web.archive.org/web/20160919231223/https://secure.msri.org/about/sgp/jim/geom/minimal/library/ennepern/index.html

Algebraic surfaces
Minimal surfaces